Bogdantsevo is a rural locality (a village) in Lavrovskoye Rural Settlement, Sudogodsky District, Vladimir Oblast, Russia. The population was 11 as of 2010.

Geography 
Bogdantsevo is located 24 km north of Sudogda (the district's administrative centre) by road. Maslovo is the nearest rural locality.

References 

Rural localities in Sudogodsky District